The Cabinet of Kuwait is the chief executive body of the State of Kuwait. The following cabinet is the 35th in the history of Kuwait. It was formed on 11 December 2017, after the previous Cabinet resigned on 30 October 2017. The last reshuffle took place on 25 December 2018. On 14 November 2019, the Prime Minister Sheikh Jaber Al-Mubarak Al-Hamed Al-Sabah tendered resignation of his cabinet to His Highness the Amir Sheikh Sabah Al-Ahmad Al-Jaber Al-Sabah.

See also
Cabinet of Kuwait
36th Cabinet of Kuwait
37th Cabinet of Kuwait

References

External links
Official English names of Kuwaiti ministers and ministries (Kuwaiti Government)

Kuwait
Government of Kuwait